The Cruzinha Nature Reserve is a protected area in the northern part of the island of Santo Antão in the Cape Verde archipelago. It covers part of the north coast of the island, between the rivers Ribeira da Garça and the Ribeira do Mocho. It contains the only coastal dunes of Santo Antão. It takes its name from the village Cruzinha da Garça, part of the town Chã de Igreja.

References

Protected areas of Cape Verde
Geography of Santo Antão, Cape Verde